Daniel Byrne was an Irish politician.

Daniel Byrne may also refer to:

Daniel Byrne of the Leicester baronets
Danny Byrne (born 1984), English footballer